NGC 2976 is a peculiar dwarf galaxy in the northern circumpolar constellation of Ursa Major. It was discovered by German-born astronomer William Herschel on November 8, 1801, and catalogued as H I.285. J. L. E. Dreyer described it as, "bright, very large, much extended 152°, star involved". It is a member of the M81 Group and lies 1° 20′ to the southwest of Messier 81.

The morphological classification of this galaxy is SAa, which matches an unbarred spiral galaxy (SA) with very tightly-wound spiral arms (a). The actual visual form of the galaxy is a pure disk with no spiral arms or bulge. The luminosity and size of this galaxy is mid-way between the Large and Small Magellanic Clouds. De Vaucouleurs and associates classed it as type SAc, suggesting more loosely wound arms. It is inclined at an angle of 65° to the line of sight from the Earth.

Although appearing as a disk, there is evidence for a non-axisymmetric form of gas distribution, with a suggestion of central bar plus large-scale spiral arms. The inner structure contains many dark lanes and stellar condensations in its disk. There are two strong H II regions, one to each side. The overall star formation rate is  y−1. The outer disk shows a history of steady star formation, although the formation rate has declined significantly over the last billion years and the population is now dominated by older stars. Within a  radius of the center, star formation has been steady, having not undergone a recent decline.

The galaxy also shows evidence of tidal stripping, with an extended tidal tail of neutral hydrogen. The last significant interaction took place around one billion years ago.

References

External links 
 
 NGC 2976 at SEDS

Dwarf galaxies
Peculiar galaxies
Unbarred spiral galaxies
M81 Group
Ursa Major (constellation)
2976
05221
28120
Astronomical objects discovered in 1801